Since 1980, the foreign relations of Iraq have been influenced by a number of controversial decisions by the Saddam Hussein administration. Hussein had good relations with the Soviet Union and a number of western countries such as France and Germany, who provided him with advanced weapons systems. He also developed a tenuous relation with the United States, who supported him during the Iran–Iraq War. However, the Invasion of Kuwait that triggered the Gulf War brutally changed Iraq's relations with the Arab World and the West. Egypt, Saudi Arabia, Syria and others were among the countries that supported Kuwait in the UN coalition. After the Hussein administration was toppled by the 2003 U.S. invasion, the governments that succeeded it have now tried to establish relations with various nations.

Africa

Americas

Asia

Europe

In September 2005, a joint political declaration between the European Union and Iraq was signed which forms the basis of regular political dialogue. A Trade and Cooperation Agreement between the EU and Iraq is in the process of being negotiated and will probably be concluded during 2008.

July 2005 saw the introduction of EUJUST LEX, the European Union's rule of law operation intended to train Iraqi police and legal officials in human rights along with other issues. Over 1,400 Iraqis have already taken part in training courses.

Oceania

Member of international organizations
Iraq belongs to the following international organizations: Arab Fund for Economic and Social Development, Arab League, Arab Monetary Fund, Council of Arab Economic Unity, Customs Cooperation Council, Economic and Social Commission for Western Asia, G-77, International Atomic Energy Agency, International Monetary Fund, International Maritime Organization, Interpol, International Organization for Standardization, International Telecommunication Union, Non-Aligned Movement, Organization of Petroleum Exporting Countries, Organization of Arab Petroleum Exporting Countries, Organisation of Islamic Cooperation, United Nations, Universal Postal Union, World Health Organization and World Bank, MENAFATF.

Ministry of Foreign Affairs
Iraq's relations with other countries and with international organizations are supervised by the Ministry of Foreign Affairs. In 1988 the minister of foreign affairs was Tariq Aziz, who was an influential leader of the Ba'ath Party and had served in that post since 1983. Aziz, Saddam Hussein, and the other members of the Revolutionary Command Council (RCC) formulated Iraq's foreign policy, and the Ministry of Foreign Affairs bureaucracy implemented RCC directives. The Baath maintained control over the Ministry of Foreign Affairs and over all Iraqi diplomatic missions abroad.

Since the overthrow of Saddam Hussein in 2003, Hoshyar Zebari was first appointed Minister of Foreign Affairs in the Iraqi Governing Council in Baghdad on 3 September 2003. On 28 June 2004, he was reappointed as Minister of Foreign Affairs by the Iraqi Interim Government, under Prime Minister Ayad Allawi. On 3 May 2005 he was sworn in as Minister of Foreign Affairs by the Iraqi Transitional Government, under Prime Minister Ibrahim al-Jaafari. On 20 May 2006, he was delegated in for the fourth consecutive time as Foreign Minister in the government of Nouri Al-Maliki.

International disputes
Iran and Iraq restored diplomatic relations in 1990 but are still trying to work out written agreements settling outstanding disputes from their eight-year war concerning border demarcation, prisoners-of-war, and freedom of navigation and sovereignty over the Shatt al-Arab waterway; in November 1994, Iraq formally accepted the United Nations-demarcated border with Kuwait which had been spelled out in Security Council Resolutions 687 (1991), 773 (1992), and 883 (1993); this formally ends earlier claims to Kuwait and to Bubiyan and Warbah islands although the government continues periodic rhetorical challenges; dispute over water development plans by Turkey for the Tigris and Euphrates rivers.

See also
 Territorial disputes in the Persian Gulf
 Disarmament of Iraq
 Iraq and the European Union
 Foreign relations of Kurdistan Region
 List of diplomatic missions of Iraq
 List of diplomatic missions in Iraq
 Visa requirements for Iraqi citizens

References

External links
 Iraq – Trade and Diplomatic Relations with the EU